Fliseryd is a locality situated in Mönsterås Municipality, Kalmar County, Sweden with 677 inhabitants as of 2010.

References

External links 

Populated places in Kalmar County
Populated places in Mönsterås Municipality